Thomas Higham may refer to:
 Thomas Higham (archaeologist), Professor of Archaeological Science at the University of Oxford
 Thomas Higham (artist) (1795 - 1844), antiquary and topographical engraver
 Gunner Higham, footballer Thomas Edwin Higham (1887 – after 1920)